

Bandy

World Championship
 January 26–2 February XXXIVth Bandy World Championship for men in Irkutsk, Russia –  wins.
 and  make their world championship débuts.
 February 19–22 VIIth Bandy World Championship for women in Lappeenranta, Finland –  wins

World Cup
 Final game, 2013 Bandy World Cup, October: Dynamo Moscow (Russia) defeats Dynamo Kazan (Russia), 3–0
 Final game, 2013 Bandy World Cup Women, October 13: Kareby IS (Sweden) defeats Rekord Irkutsk (Russia), 4–3

National championships
 March 1 –  Minneapolis Bandolier becomes United States champion for men
 March 15 –  AIK becomes Swedish champion for women
 March 15 –  Oulun Luistinseura becomes Finnish champion for men
 March 16 –  Sandvikens AIK becomes Swedish champion for men
 March 17 –  Sudet becomes Finnish champion for women
 March 30 –  Yenisey becomes Russian champion for men
 March –  Nordre Sande IL/Drammen Bandy becomes Norwegian champion for women
 March –  Stabæk IF becomes Norwegian champion for men
 May 6 – The Gothenburg-based club GAIS decides to withdraw from next season's Swedish top-tier Elitserien in spite of being qualified.

Bobsleigh and skeleton

 November 30, 2013 – January 26, 2014: 2013–14 Bobsleigh World Cup and 2013–14 Skeleton World Cup together
 Overall two-man bobsleigh winner:  Steven Holcomb / Steven Langton
 Overall four-man bobsleigh winner:  Maximilian Arndt / Marko Hübenbecker / Alexander Rödiger / Martin Putze
 Overall two-women bobsleigh winner:  Kaillie Humphries / Heather Moyse
 Overall combined two-man and four-man overall winner:  Steven Holcomb (driver)
 Overall men's skeleton winner:  Martins Dukurs
 Overall women's skeleton winner:  Lizzy Yarnold
 February 13 – 15: 2014 Winter Olympics (Skeleton)
 Men:   Aleksandr Tretyakov;   Martins Dukurs;   Matthew Antoine
 Women:   Lizzy Yarnold;   Noelle Pikus-Pace;   Elena Nikitina
 February 16 – 23: 2014 Winter Olympics (Bobsleigh)
 Two-man:   Alexandr Zubkov / Alexey Voyevoda;   Beat Hefti / Alex Baumann;   Steven Holcomb / Steven Langton
 Four-man:  ;  ;  
 Two-women:   Kaillie Humphries / Heather Moyse;   Elana Meyers / Lauryn Williams;   Jamie Greubel / Aja Evans

Curling

2013 Curlers Corner Autumn Gold Curling Classic (Calgary, Alberta, October 11–14)
 Winner:  Eve Muirhead (skip)
2013 Manitoba Liquor & Lotteries Women's Classic (Winnipeg, Manitoba, October 25–28)
 Winner:  Jennifer Jones (skip)
2013 The Masters Grand Slam of Curling (Abbotsford, British Columbia, October 29–November 3)
 Men's winner:  Glenn Howard (skip)
 Women's winner:  Rachel Homan (skip)
2013 Canadian Open of Curling (Medicine Hat, Alberta, November 13–17)
 Winner:  Kevin Koe (skip)
2013 Colonial Square Ladies Classic (Saskatoon, Saskatchewan, November 15–18)
 Winner:  Jennifer Jones (skip)
2013 Canadian Olympic Curling Trials (Winnipeg, Manitoba, December 1–8)
 Men's winner:  Brad Jacobs (skip)
 Women's winner:  Jennifer Jones (skip)
 January 16 – 19: 2014 Continental Cup of Curling in  Paradise
 Team North America (/) defeated Team World 36–24.
 February 10 – 21: 2014 Winter Olympics (Men) and (Women)
 Men:  ;  ;  
 Women:  ;  ;  
 February 26 – March 5: 2014 World Junior Curling Championships in  Flims
 Men's winner:  Yannick Schwaller (skip)
 Women's winner:  Kelsey Rocque (skip)
2014 The National (Fort McMurray, Alberta, March 12–16)
 March 15 – 23: 2014 Ford World Women's Curling Championship in  Saint John, New Brunswick
 Winner:  Binia Feltscher (skip)
 March 29 – April 6: 2014 World Men's Curling Championship in  Beijing
 Winner:  Thomas Ulsrud (skip)
2014 Players' Championship (Summerside, Prince Edward Island, April 15–20)
 April 23 – 30: 2014 World Mixed Doubles Curling Championship and 2014 World Senior Curling Championships together in  Dumfries
 Mixed doubles winners:  Michelle and Reto Gribi
 Men's seniors winner:  Wayne Tallon (skip)
 Women's seniors winner:  Christine Cannon (skip)

Figure skating

 October 18 – November 24, 2013: 2013–14 ISU Grand Prix of Figure Skating
  won both the gold and overall medal tallies.
 December 5 – 8, 2013: 2013–14 Grand Prix of Figure Skating Final at  Fukuoka
 Senior
 Men:  Yuzuru Hanyu
 Ladies:  Mao Asada
 Pairs:  Aliona Savchenko / Robin Szolkowy
 Ice dance:  Meryl Davis / Charlie White
 Junior
 Men:  Jin Boyang
 Ladies:  Maria Sotskova
 Pairs:  Yu Xiaoyu / Jin Yang
 Ice dance:  Anna Yanovskaya / Sergey Mozgov
 January 13 – 19: 2014 European Figure Skating Championships at  Budapest
 Men:  Javier Fernández
 Ladies:  Yulia Lipnitskaya
 Pairs:  Tatiana Volosozhar / Maxim Trankov
 Ice dance:  Anna Cappellini / Luca Lanotte
 January 20 – 26: 2014 Four Continents Figure Skating Championships at  Taipei
 Men:  Takahito Mura
 Ladies:  Kanako Murakami
 Pairs:  Sui Wenjing / Han Cong
 Ice dance:  Madison Hubbell / Zachary Donohue
 February 6 – 22: 2014 Winter Olympics
 Men:  Yuzuru Hanyu
 Ladies:  Adelina Sotnikova
 Pairs:  Tatiana Volosozhar / Maxim Trankov
 Ice Dance:  Meryl Davis / Charlie White
 Team:  ;  ;  
 March 10 – 16: 2014 World Junior Figure Skating Championships at  Sofia
 Men:  Nam Nguyen
 Ladies:  Elena Radionova
 Pairs:  Yu Xiaoyu / Jin Yang
 Ice dance:  Kaitlin Hawayek / Jean-Luc Baker
 March 24 – 30: 2014 World Figure Skating Championships at  Saitama
 Men:  Yuzuru Hanyu
 Ladies:  Mao Asada
 Pairs:  Aliona Savchenko / Robin Szolkowy
 Ice Dance:  Anna Cappellini / Luca Lanotte

Ice hockey

 September 4, 2013 – March 3, 2014: 2013–14 KHL season
 KHL Continental Cup winner:  Dynamo Moscow
  Sergei Mozyakin, of the  Metallurg Magnitogorsk team, was the top scorer for this season.
 March 7 – April 30: 2014 Gagarin Cup playoffs
 Champions:  Metallurg Magnitogorsk (first KHL title)
 March 7 – April 6: 2014 Nadezhda Cup
 Champions:  Avangard Omsk
 October 1, 2013 – April 13, 2014: 2013–14 NHL season
 Presidents' Trophy and Eastern Conference regular season winner:  Boston Bruins
 Western Conference regular season winner:  Anaheim Ducks
  Sidney Crosby, of the  Pittsburgh Penguins, was the top scorer for this season.
 April 16 – June 13: 2014 Stanley Cup playoffs
 The  Los Angeles Kings defeated the  New York Rangers, 4–1 (in games won), to claim its second NHL title.
 2014 Conn Smythe Trophy winner:  Justin Williams (Los Angeles Kings)
 December 26, 2013 – January 5, 2014: 2014 World Junior Ice Hockey Championships in  Malmö
  defeated  3–2, in overtime, to claim its third title.  claimed the bronze medal.
 January 1: 2014 NHL Winter Classic (Toronto vs. Detroit) at Michigan Stadium in Ann Arbor
  The Toronto Maple Leafs defeated the  Detroit Red Wings 3–2 in a shootout.
 January 11: 2014 KHL All-Star Game at the Ondrej Nepela Arena in  Bratislava
 Team West defeated Team East 18–16.
 January 25 – March 1: 2014 NHL Stadium Series (debut)
 January 25: Anaheim Ducks versus the Los Angeles Kings at Dodger Stadium
 Anaheim Ducks defeated the Los Angeles Kings 3–0.
 January 26: New Jersey Devils versus the New York Rangers at Yankee Stadium
 New York Rangers defeated the New Jersey Devils 7–3.
 January 29: New York Islanders versus the New York Rangers at Yankee Stadium
 New York Rangers defeated the New York Islanders 2–1.
 March 1: Pittsburgh Penguins versus the Chicago Blackhawks at Soldier Field
 Chicago Blackhawks defeated the Pittsburgh Penguins 5–1.
 February 8 – 20: 2014 Winter Olympics (Women)
  ;  ;  . Canada defeated the United States, 3–2, in overtime, to claim its fourth consecutive Olympic women's ice hockey gold medal.
 February 12 – 23: 2014 Winter Olympics (Men)
  ;  ;  . Canada defeated Sweden, with the score of 3–0, to claim its ninth Olympic title.
 March 2: 2014 Heritage Classic (NHL) (Ottawa vs. Vancouver) at BC Place
  Ottawa Senators defeated the  Vancouver Canucks 4–2.
 March 14 – 23: 2014 NCAA National Collegiate Women's Ice Hockey Tournament (Frozen Four at TD Bank Sports Center in Hamden, Connecticut)
 The  Clarkson Golden Knights defeated the  Minnesota Golden Gophers 5–4 to win their first NCAA title. It was also the first top-level NCAA women's title won by a school from outside the Western Collegiate Hockey Association, which had claimed all 13 previous titles.
 March 23 – 30: 2014 IIHF World Women's U18 Championship at  Budapest
The  claimed the bronze medal.
 March 28 – April 12: 2014 NCAA Division I Men's Ice Hockey Tournament (Frozen Four at Wells Fargo Center in Philadelphia)
 The  Union Dutchmen defeated the  Minnesota Golden Gophers 7–4 to claim their first NCAA title.
 April 14 – 19: 2014 Allan Cup at  Dundas, Ontario 
 The  Dundas Real McCoys defeated the  Clarenville Caribous, 3–2, to win their first title.
 April 17 – 27: 2014 IIHF World U18 Championships at  Lappeenranta and Imatra
 May 9 – 25: 2014 IIHF World Championship in  Minsk
  defeated , 5–2, to claim its fifth title.  took the bronze medal.
 May 16 – 25: 2014 Memorial Cup at  London, Ontario
 The  Edmonton Oil Kings defeated the  Guelph Storm in the final, 6–3, to win their first title since 1966.

Luge

 November 16, 2013 – January 26, 2014: 2013–14 Luge World Cup
 Men's singles overall winner:  Felix Loch
 Men's doubles overall winner:  Tobias Wendl / Tobias Arlt
 Women's singles overall winner:  Natalie Geisenberger
 Team Relay overall winner: 
 February 8 – 13: 2014 Winter Olympics
 Men's singles:   Felix Loch;   Albert Demchenko;   Armin Zöggeler
 Women's singles:   Natalie Geisenberger;   Tatjana Hüfner;   Erin Hamlin
 Men's doubles:   Tobias Arlt/Tobias Wendl;   Andreas Linger/Wolfgang Linger;   Andris Šics/Juris Šics
 Team relay:  ;  ;

Speed skating

Long track
 November 8, 2013 – March 16, 2014: 2013–14 ISU Speed Skating World Cup
 November 8 – 10, 2013, in  Calgary
  won both the gold and overall medal tallies.
 November 15 – 17, 2013, in  Salt Lake City
 November 29 – December 1, 2013, in  Astana
  won the gold medal tally.  won the overall medal tally.
 December 6 – 8, 2013, in  Berlin
  won both the gold and overall medal tallies.
 March 7 – 9, 2014, in  Inzell
  won both the gold and overall medal tallies.
 March 14 – 16, 2014, in  Heerenveen
  won both the gold and overall medal tallies.
 January 11 – 12: 2014 Essent ISU European Speed Skating Championships at  Hamar
  won both the gold and overall medal tallies.
 January 18 – 19: 2014 World Sprint Speed Skating Championships in  Nagano
 Men's overall winner:  Michel Mulder
 Women's overall winner:  Yu Jing
 February 8 – 22: 2014 Winter Olympics
  won both the gold and overall medal tallies.
 March 7 – 9: 2014 World Junior Speed Skating Championships at  Bjugn
  won both the gold and overall medal tallies.
 March 21 – 23: 2014 World Allround Speed Skating Championships in  Heerenveen
 Men's winner:  Koen Verweij
 Women's winner:  Ireen Wüst

Short track
 September 26 – November 17, 2013: 2013–14 ISU Short Track Speed Skating World Cup
 September 28 & 29 at  Shanghai
  won both the gold and overall medal tallies.
 October 5 & 6 at  Seoul
  won both the gold and overall medal tallies.
 November 7 – 10 at  Turin
  won both the gold and overall medal tallies.
 November 14 – 17 at  Kolomna
  won the gold medal tally.  and  share the overall medal tally.
 January 17 – 19: 2014 European Short Track Speed Skating Championships at  Dresden
 Men's overall winner:  Viktor Ahn
 Women's overall winner:  Jorien ter Mors
 February 10 – 21: 2014 Winter Olympics
  won the gold medal tally.  won the overall medal tally.
 March 7 – 9: 2014 World Junior Short Track Speed Skating Championships at  Erzurum
  won both the gold and overall medal tallies.
 March 14 – 16: 2014 World Short Track Speed Skating Championships in  Montreal
  won both the gold and overall medal tallies.

References

External links
 Federation of International Bandy
 The International Bobsleigh and Skeleton Federation
 World Curling Federation
 International Skating Union
 International Ice Hockey Federation
 International Luge Federation

Ice sports
Ice sports by year
Ice sports